Elisha Aryeh Pazner (April 16, 1941 – March 28, 1979) was an Israeli economic theorist with important contributions in the theory of welfare economics and fair division.

Education
1971 – PhD., Economics, Harvard University. Dissertation: "Optimal Resource Allocation and Distribution: The Role of the Public Sector". Under the direction of R.A. Musgrave and S.A. Marglin.
1969 – M.A., Economics, Harvard University.
1966 – B.A., Economics, The Hebrew University of Jerusalem.

References

1941 births
1979 deaths
Game theorists
Hebrew University of Jerusalem Faculty of Social Sciences alumni
Academic staff of Tel Aviv University
Harvard University alumni